Ntambanana Local Municipality was a local municipality within the uThungulu District of KwaZulu-Natal in South Africa. In 2016, the municipality was dissolved and its territory divided between Mthonjaneni Local Municipality, uMhlathuze Local Municipality and uMfolozi Local Municipality.

The municipality was named after the Ntambanana River, which passes through the municipality.

The Ingonyama Trust owns 85% of the land in the former municipal area, with the remaining 15% being privately owned by commercial farmers.

Main places
The 2001 census divided the municipality into the following main places:

Politics 

The municipal council consisted of sixteen members elected by mixed-member proportional representation. Eight councillors were elected by first-past-the-post voting in eight wards, while the remaining eight were chosen from party lists so that the total number of party representatives was proportional to the number of votes received. In the election of 18 May 2011 no party obtained a majority, and the African National Congress (ANC) and the National Freedom Party (NFP) formed a coalition to govern the municipality. The following table shows the results of the election.

References

External links
 http://www.ntambanana.org.za/

Former local municipalities of South Africa